The Mount Stuart visitor centre on the Bute estate, near Rothsay on the Island of Bute was designed by the architect Alfred Munkenbeck of Munkenbeck + Marshall, and was opened by Richard Attenborough in June 2001.

Awards 
RIBA Award in 2002.

References 

Architecture in Scotland
Visitor centres in Scotland